Petrovka is a rural locality (a khutor) in Nizhnereutchansky Selsoviet Rural Settlement, Medvensky District, Kursk Oblast, Russia. Population:

Geography 
The khutor is located on the Medvenka (a.k.a. Medvensky Kolodez) Brook (a left tributary of the Polnaya in the basin of the Seym), 66 km from the Russia–Ukraine border, 32 km south of Kursk, at the northern border of the district center – the urban-type settlement Medvenka, 9 km from the selsoviet center – Nizhny Reutets.

 Streets
There is Kolkhoznaya Street and 106 houses.

 Climate
Petrovka has a warm-summer humid continental climate (Dfb in the Köppen climate classification).

Transport 
Petrovka is located on the federal route  Crimea Highway (a part of the European route ), 0.5 km from the road of intermunicipal significance  (M2 "Crimea Highway" – Sadovy), 25.5 km from the nearest railway halt 457 km (railway line Lgov I — Kursk).

The rural locality is situated 38 km from Kursk Vostochny Airport, 91 km from Belgorod International Airport and 218 km from Voronezh Peter the Great Airport.

References

Notes

Sources

Rural localities in Medvensky District